The men's high jump event at the 2016 African Championships in Athletics was held on 24 June in Kings Park Stadium.

Results

References

2016 African Championships in Athletics
High jump at the African Championships in Athletics